Peter McLagan (1823 – 31 August 1900) was a British Liberal Party politician who sat in the House of Commons from 1865 to 1893. He was Scotland's first non-White and first Black MP.

Life

McLagan was born in Demerara in British Guiana. His father was Peter McLagan (1774–1860), and his mother was an unknown black woman. His father co-owned a sugar plantation with Samuel Sandbach. When the UK Government emancipated the slaves in the 1830s, they compensated over £21,000 (£2,791,310 in 2020) to the elder McLagan and Sandbach for the legal emancipation of over 400 slaves.

He left British Guiana with his father as a child and was educated in Tillicoultry and Peebles, before attending the University of Edinburgh.

In 1841, at the age of 18, he is known to be living at 77 Great King Street in the New Town, Edinburgh, with his father and cousin. His father died in 1860 and is buried in New Calton cemetery.

At the 1865 general election, he was elected unopposed as the Member of Parliament for Linlithgowshire, and was re-elected at the next six general elections. He resigned his seat on 2 June 1893 by becoming Steward of the Manor of Northstead.

As an MP, he supported women's suffrage, the need for women doctors, and the Irish Home Rule Movement.

In 1878, he and his wife supported the erection of the McLagan memorial water fountain in Bathgate.

McLagan owned the Pumpherston estate in West Lothian.

He died at Marylebone in London but is buried with his wife in the churchyard of Kirk of Calder in Mid Calder, West Lothian.

Family

He was married to Elizabeth Ann Taylor (1846–1882).

References

External links 
 

1823 births
1900 deaths
Scottish Liberal Party MPs
Members of the Parliament of the United Kingdom for Scottish constituencies
Black British politicians
UK MPs 1865–1868
UK MPs 1868–1874
UK MPs 1874–1880
UK MPs 1880–1885
UK MPs 1885–1886
UK MPs 1886–1892
UK MPs 1892–1895
Black British MPs